The Green is a part of the Hyderabad Metro system in Telangana, India. The line is 16.6 km and spans 15 stations from JBS Parade Ground to Falaknuma. It was funded by a public–private partnership (PPP), with the state government holding a minority equity stake. A special purpose vehicle company, L&T Metro Rail Hyderabad Ltd (L&TMRHL), was established by the construction company Larsen & Toubro (L&T) to develop the Hyderabad Metro rail project. 

An  stretch of the Green Line from JBS Parade Ground to MG Bus Station, with 9 stations, was inaugurated on 7 February 2020 by Telangana Chief Minister K. Chandrasekhar Rao, and opened to the public the next day. A 5.6 km southward extension from MG Bus Station to Falaknuma is yet to be completed in the Old City.

Construction
Green Line sections were opened as indicated below.

Stations

References

Hyderabad Metro
Suburban rail in India